Arthur Grove Day (1904 in Philadelphia – March 26, 1994 in Hawaii) was a writer, teacher, and authority on the history of Hawaii, the founding editor in chief of Pacific Science: A Quarterly Devoted to the Biological and Physical Sciences of the Pacific Region.

Day earned his bachelor's and graduate degrees from Stanford University, where he befriended John Steinbeck. He moved to Hawaii in 1944 and was a professor in the English department of the University of Hawaii at Manoa, where he taught a course in "Literature of the Pacific". He chaired the English department from 1948 to 1953. In 1979, he won the Hawaii Award for Literature.

Books 
Day was a scholar of the South Pacific and wrote or edited more than fifty books, including
 History Makers of Hawaii
 Hawaiian Reader
 Mark Twain’s Letters from Hawaii
 Best South Sea Stories
 Mad About Islands: Of a Vanished Pacific, a collection of biographical essays on famous writers who spent time in the Pacific, including Jack London, Herman Melville, and Robert Louis Stevenson
 Rascals in Paradise, co-written with James Michener

References

20th-century American historians
American male non-fiction writers
1904 births
1994 deaths
20th-century American male writers
Stanford University alumni